Promyshlenny (masculine), Promyshlennaya (feminine), or Promyshlennoye (neuter) is the name of several inhabited localities in Russia.

Urban localities
Promyshlenny, Komi Republic, an urban-type settlement under the administrative jurisdiction of Vorgashor Administrative Territory of Vorkuta, Komi Republic
Promyshlennaya, an urban-type settlement in Promyshlennovsky District of Kemerovo Oblast

Rural localities
Promyshlenny, Altai Krai, a settlement in Novikovsky Selsoviet of Biysky District of Altai Krai

Abolished localities
Promyshlenny, Sakha Republic, a selo in Kobyaysky District of the Sakha Republic; abolished in 2008